Karezat is a large tehsil of Karezat District. Karezat is in the north east of Pishin, Pakistan. In Karezat, the largest city is Khanozai Bazar.

Karezat is a tehsil and sub-division of the Karezat District of Balochistan Province, Pakistan.

The name Karezat refers to the karezes, underground channels with vertical access shafts, used to transport water from an aquifer under a hill, in the villages of the tehsil. Only Two karezes remains in the village Khushab, and the other is in Village Newkarez Murgha, all are no longer usable, due to drought.

It comprises many large villages which have large populations of the Kakar tribe; residents' livelihoods are based on agriculture.  In early times, farms were irrigated by the karezes, which were the major source of water in the area.

References 

Pishin District